Black Snow is a 1990 Chinese drama film directed by Xie Fei. It was written and adapted from a novel by Liu Heng.  It was entered into the 40th Berlin International Film Festival, where it won the Silver Bear for an outstanding single achievement. Although the English film title follows the original name of the novel, the Chinese film title 本命年 běnmìngnián means the year when someone is aged 12, 24, 36, and so on when the Twelve Terrestrial Branches come round again.

Plot
The film captures the social impact of political change in China at the time. A semi-literate who was deprived of schooling during the Cultural Revolution, Li Huiquan, is released from labor camp. He arrives back in his native Beijing to find that he has no family or prospects or friends, just his underworld contacts trying to drag him back into a life of crime.  His attempts to make good are continually thwarted. His street stall selling clothes puts him on the fringe of the black market, and he soon gets lured back into his old neighbourhood gangs. His disenchanted comrades include a nightclub chanteuse as well as an escaped convict. The film's lurking handheld camera visually presents realistic footage of a man destined for the past from which he left behind.

Cast
 Cai Hongxiang as Cui Yongli
 Jiang Wen as Li Huiquan, nickname Quanzi
 Lin Cheng as Zhau Yaqiu 
 Yue Hong
 Meng Jin
 Liu Xiaoning 
 Liang Tian
 Fang Zige
 Yue Hong

Reception

Awards
Berlin International Film Festival, 1990
Fei Xie Silver Berlin Bear (won)
Fei Xie Golden Berlin Bear (nominated)
Hundred Flowers Awards, 1990
Best Film (won) tied with Jue zhan zhi hou (1991)

DVD release
In 2010, Black Snow was released as a DVD in a new High-Definition transfer and a booklet featuring essay by author and academic Professor Shaoyi Sun. It includes a 32-minute interview with Xie Fei, in which the director discusses a variety of topics from his training in cinema, to the Cultural Revolution and his approach to teaching filmmaking.

References

External links

Second Run DVD - Official DVD release company

1990 films
1990s Mandarin-language films
1990 drama films
Films directed by Xie Fei
Arts in China
Films with screenplays by Liu Heng
Chinese drama films